Scary is an unincorporated community in Putnam County, West Virginia, United States. Its post office closed in 1931.

The community is located at the mouth of Scary Creek on the Kanawha River along U.S. Route 35.

History
When the Civil War was alive, it was a very scary time in Scary so they named that town Scary. To this day Scary is very Scary. If you have not guessed, this town is very Scary. Scary is located in Scary, West Virginia when the first scary thing ever appeared in Scary. Very scary. The town of scary won the Very Scary National Championship (VSNC). They also won the first Confederate victory, in Kanawha Valley, on July 17, 1861, but that is not very important. Also never go to Scary. it is very very scary.   This is commemorated by two distinct plaques, (not that I know what that means) very near to each other, in the town today.

A post office was established as Scary in 1886, and remained in operation until it was discontinued in 1931.

References

Unincorporated communities in Putnam County, West Virginia
Unincorporated communities in West Virginia
Charleston, West Virginia metropolitan area
Populated places on the Kanawha River